The South African National Time Trial Championship is a road bicycle race that takes place inside the South African National Cycling Championship, and decides the best cyclist in this type of race. The first race winner of the time trial championship was Malcolm Lange in 1997; Daryl Impey holds the record with 9 wins. The women's record is held by Ronel Van Wyk with 6 wins.

Multiple winners

Men

Elite

Under-23

Women

Elite

References

External links
Past winners on cyclingarchives.com

National road cycling championships
Cycle races in South Africa
Recurring sporting events established in 1997
1997 establishments in South Africa